The Lonestar Legacy were a trilogy of books written by Pastor Gilbert Morris, they are set in the early-mid 19th century in Texas and mix both fiction with non-fiction.

Plot
The books generally follow the life of Jerusalem Ann Hardin and the Hardin Family, who are living on a farm in Arkansas Territory near Arkadelphia in 1831. Whilst out with his sister, Brodie Hardin is confronted by the Brattons, a rival family, when Brodie and the Brattons get into a fight a mysterious stranger called Clay Taliferro (pronounced Tolliver) steps in and saves Brodie's life. Clay ends up staying with the Hardins and helping out on the farm, one day Jerusalem decides to move to Texas and Clay takes them there. The family set up home but soon they are facing Comanche raids and all sorts of problems. Jerusalem and Clay develop a love for each other and eventually marry and have their own children. The books also follow aspects of the Texas Revolution the battles at Goliad and Alamo are described.

Character histories
Jerusalem Ann Hardin Taliferro- Main character of the books, she is described as having red hair and green eyes, she is the mother of 7 children and has been married twice, to Jake Hardin and to Clay Taliferro.

Clay Taliferro- Clay was a friend of Jake Hardin's from the mountains, he appears after saving Brodie from a fight with a rival family. He takes the Hardins to Texas, saves Jerusalem and Moriah from Comanche war leader Red Wolf and fights in the battle of Giliad. He later falls in love with and marries Jerusalem. He has 3 children with Jerusalem, twins Samuel and Rachael Belle and David.

Brodie Hardin- Eldest son of Jerusalem and Jake Hardin, in 1831 he is 14 years old, he is described as lanky. Along with Quaid Shafter he saves his sister Moriah from Comanche Indians. He doesn't marry and joins the Texas Rangers.

Moriah Hardin- Eldest Daughter of Jerusalem and Jake, she is 12 years old in 1831, she is described as inquisitive, and is constantly asking questions, later on she falls in love with and becomes engaged to a city man called Leonard Pennington from Saint Louis but not long afterwards she is captured by comanche Indians and becomes war chief Bear Killer's third wife. she bears him a son Ethan.

Clinton Hardin- third child of Jerusalem and Jake Hardin, Clinton is 10 at the start of the third book, he is almost identical to his father and very stocky in build. He is a baptist and is constantly telling people about his religion, however, as he grows older he begins riding with the Texas Rangers.

Jacob "Jake" Hardin- Husband of Jerusalem, Jake is killed at the battle of the Alamo, he is a wayward husband and hardly ever sees his family, it is later revealed he has another family on the side. After his second family is killed from smallpox Jake comes back to Jerusalem, but the two decide they cannot see each other. 

Mary Aiden Hardin- Youngest Hardin child, Mary Aiden is just a baby in the first book but grows up to be an energetic and selfish teenager who lots of men fall in love with.

Julie Belle Morgan- Jerusalem's sister, she is described as about 5 years her junior, she first appears when Jerusalem sends Clay to a saloon to get her, she is described as a saloon woman, and tries to sleep with Clay, She pretends to be Clay's wife to get land in Texas, she later becomes a Christian and marries preacher Rice Morgan, they have a daughter called Esther.

Zane Satterfield- Jerusalem's older brother, he is a prisoner and escapes after beating a guard to death. He moves to Texas and lives with the Taliffero's at the Yellow Rose ranch. In his late 40s he becomes a Christian and marries Beverly Despain however shortly after the marriage he is killed in a comanche raid. Beverly discovers she is pregnant with his child and Ruth Anne Satterfield is born on 1 January 1847.

Fergus St. John Nightingale III- An English doctor, he first appears when the Hardins are on their way to Texas, Clay and Brodie rescue him from a group of Indians.

Rice (Rhys) Morgan- A Welsh preacher, he later marries Julie Satterfield and they have a daughter called Esther

Samuel and Rachael Belle Taliffero- are the twin children of Clay and Jerusalem Taliferro.

Ethan Hardin- The son of Moriah Hardin and Comanche war chief Bear Killer, Ethan and Moriah are saved by Quaid Shafter but Ethan faces strong prejudice for his half Indian blood. Also his father Bear Killer is obsessed about getting his son back and has a vendetta against the Hardins.

Jewel Mitchell Satterfield- mother of Zane, Jerusalem and Julie, she dies early on in the first book and is buried alongside her husband Mark

Josiah Mitchell- Jerusalem Hardin's elderly Grandfather, who fought in the independence war, his birth date is given as 1748. he goes to Texas with the Hardin's but is later killed and scalped in a Comanche raid.

2003 novels
Novels set in Texas